Gambissara Forest Park is a forest park in the Gambia. Established on January 1, 1954, it covers 308 hectares.

Gambissara Forest Park is 38 meters above sea level.

References

Protected areas established in 1954
Forest parks of the Gambia